The 2011 Atlantic Sun Conference baseball tournament was held at Ken Dugan Field at Stephen Lee Marsh Stadium on the campus of Lipscomb University in Nashville, TN from May 25 through 28.  Belmont won its first tournament championship to earn the Atlantic Sun Conference's automatic bid to the 2011 NCAA Division I baseball tournament.

Seeding
The top six teams (based on conference results) from the conference earn invites to the tournament.

Results

All-Tournament Team

References

Tournament
ASUN Conference Baseball Tournament
Atlantic Sun baseball tournament
Atlantic Sun baseball tournament